The Fannin Formation is a geologic formation in British Columbia. It preserves fossils dating back to the Early Jurassic period (Pliensbachian to Toarcian stages).

See also 
 List of fossiliferous stratigraphic units in British Columbia

References

Further reading 
 E. S. Carter, S. Gorian, J. Guex, L. O'Dogherty, P. De Wever, P. Dumitrica, R. S. Hori, A. Matsuoka, and P. A. Whalen. 2010. Global radiolarian zonation for the Pliensbachian, Toarcian and Aalenian. Palaeogeography, Palaeoclimatology, Palaeoecology 297:401-419
 M. Aberhan. 1998. Early Jurassic Bivalvia of western Canada. Part I. Subclasses Palaeotaxodonta, Pteriomorpha, and Isofilibranchia. Beringeria 21:57-150
 G. K. Jakobs. 1997. Toarcian (Early Jurassic) ammonoids from western North America. Geological Survey of Canada, Bulletin 428 1-137
 P. L. Smith and H. W. Tipper. 1996. Pliensbachian (Lower Jurassic) ammonites of the Queen Charlotte Islands, British Columbia. Bulletins of American Paleontology 108(348):1-122

Geologic formations of Canada
Jurassic British Columbia
Toarcian Stage
Sandstone formations of Canada
Limestone formations
Shallow marine deposits
Paleontology in British Columbia